Louisa Chirico (born May 16, 1996) is an American tennis player. She is of Korean descent through her mother.

Chirico, who comes from Harrison, New York, has won five singles and two doubles titles on the ITF Women's Circuit. On 24 October 2016, she reached her best singles ranking of world No. 58. On 6 March 2017, she peaked at No. 184 in the WTA doubles rankings.

Tennis career

Early years
Partnering Jan Abaza, Chirico won her first $50k tournament at the 2013 Melbourne Pro Classic, defeating Asia Muhammad and Allie Will in the final.

2015: Grand Slam debut
She made her major main-draw debut at the 2015 French Open after being awarded a wildcard into the event by the USTA. She lost in the first round to the ninth seed Ekaterina Makarova, in straight sets.

Chirico won her first WTA Tour match at the 2015 Washington Open where she defeated Heather Watson. She then beat the top-30 player Alizé Cornet in a third set tie-breaker but lost to Sloane Stephens in the quarterfinals.

2016–2018: First major win
In May 2016, Chirico won five qualifier and main-draw matches at the Madrid Open to reach the semifinals. Later that month, she reached the main draw of the 2016 French Open through three qualifying wins and made it through to the second round.

After reaching a career-high ranking of No. 58 in October 2016, Chirico dropped outside the top 500 in September 2018.

2022: Return to majors
She qualified into the main draw of the Wimbledon Championships after a five years absence from the majors since Roland Garros 2017.

Grand Slam performance timelines

Singles

Doubles

WTA 125 tournament finals

Singles: 1 (runner–up)

ITF Circuit finals

Singles: 10 (5 titles, 5 runner–ups)

Doubles: 6 (2 titles, 4 runner–ups)

Notes

References

External links

 
 

1996 births
Living people
People from Harrison, New York
American female tennis players
Tennis people from New York (state)
Tennis players at the 2015 Pan American Games
American sportspeople of Korean descent
Korean-American tennis players
Pan American Games competitors for the United States
21st-century American women